Henry Ring (born March 16, 1977 in Franklin, Tennessee) is a retired soccer goalkeeper, who last played for the Chicago Fire in Major League Soccer.

Ring attended the University of South Carolina where he played for the men's soccer team from 1997 to 2000.  He was a third team All American both seasons. During his collegiate career, he spent one season with the Central Jersey Riptide in the Premier Development League in 1999.

In February 2001, the Chicago Fire selected Ring in the third round of the 2001 MLS SuperDraft. He saw no time his first season with the team, and only played in one league game each of the following two years.  In 2002, the Fire sent Ring on loan to the Milwaukee Rampage for one game.  In 2003, he went on loan to the Rochester Rhinos as back up to Bill Andracki.  In 2004, he played in 28 league games, recording seven shutouts and starting for the East in the MLS All-Star Game.  In the offseason, after Chicago welcomed back Zach Thornton and gave him back his old starting spot without a competition, Ring was traded to F.C. Dallas for a draft pick. However, Ring chose not to sign with Dallas, and after an unsuccessful bid at winning the outright starting job with the MetroStars, Ring retired.

References

External links
 MLS Stats

1977 births
Living people
American soccer players
Soccer players from Tennessee
Central Jersey Riptide players
Chicago Fire FC players
Association football goalkeepers
Milwaukee Rampage players
People from Franklin, Tennessee
Rochester New York FC players
South Carolina Gamecocks men's soccer players
USL League Two players
A-League (1995–2004) players
Major League Soccer players
Major League Soccer All-Stars
Chicago Fire FC draft picks